Lady Doak College (LDC) is the first women's college in Madurai in the southern Indian state of Tamil Nadu. It was founded in 1948 by Katie Wilcox, an American missionary near Tallakulam in Madurai. Today there are around 3200 students. This number was only 86 at formation.

It is named after Helen Doak, the associate founder.

Location

It is located on Lady Doak College road near Narimedu and Bibikulam, the places which are well connected by road transport.

Academics
LDC offers courses in the following areas:

Aided courses

 Bachelor of Arts (B.A.): History specialization in Tourism, Psychology and Sociology, Economics (English & Tamil medium), English Literature and Tamil Literature
 Bachelor of Science (B.Sc.(specialization)): Mathematics, Physics, Chemistry with Cheminformatics, Botany (specialization in Industrial Microbiology) and Zoology (specialization in Biotechnology)
 Bachelor of Commerce (B.Com.)
 Master of Arts (M.A.): English Literature, Tamil Literature, History and Economics
 Master of Science (M.Sc.): Mathematics and Zoology (specialization in Biotechnology)
 Doctoral research in Zoology, Economics, Physics, Tamil, Botany & Microbiology

Self-financed courses
 Bachelor of Science (B.Sc.): Computer Application, Information Technology & Management, Mathematics with Computer Application, Physics with Computer Application, Biotechnology, Fashion Designing and Physical Education & Sports Science
 Bachelor of Commerce (B.Com.): Commerce with Computer Application, Corporate Secretaryship, Banking & Insurance, Professional Accounting
 Bachelor of Business Administration (B.B.A.)
 Master of Science (M.Sc.): Psychology, Microbiology, Chemistry, Physics, Biotechnology, Information Technology, Computer Science
 Master of Commerce (M.Com. with Computer Application)
 Masters in Social Work (MSW) in Social Work
 Postgraduate diploma (one year) 
 Postgraduate diploma in Remote Sensing and GIS
 Human Resource Development (PGRS&GIS)
 Bioinformatics
 Master of Philosophy (M.Phil.): Tamil, Commerce, Economics, Microbiology, English, Chemistry, History, Physics & Biotechnology

External links 
 http://www.ladydoakcollege.edu.in/
 http://www.indiastudychannel.com/colleges/7679-Lady-Doak-College-Autonomous.aspx

Women's universities and colleges in Tamil Nadu
Educational institutions established in 1948
Association of Christian Universities and Colleges in Asia
1948 establishments in India
Colleges in Madurai
Colleges affiliated to Madurai Kamaraj University
Universities and colleges in Madurai
Academic institutions formerly affiliated with the University of Madras